{{DISPLAYTITLE:C10H14N2O5}}
The molecular formula C10H14N2O5 (molar mass: 242.23 g/mol, exact mass: 242.0903 u) may refer to:

 Telbivudine
 Thymidine